Contact is an annual interdisciplinary conference that brings together renowned social and space scientists, science fiction writers and artists to exchange ideas, stimulate new perspectives, and encourage serious, creative speculation about humanity's future. The intent of Contact is to promote the integration of human factors into space research and policy, to explore the intersection of science and art, and to develop ethical approaches to cross-cultural contact. Since its beginnings, the Contact conference has fostered interdisciplinary inquiries into art, literature, exploration and scientific investigation.

Contact was conceived by anthropologist Jim Funaro in 1979, and the first formal conference was held in 1983 in Santa Cruz, California. Twenty-six annual events have followed and several held at NASA Ames Research Center. In many previous years, the COTI HI project involved teams of high school students in the creation of scientifically accurate extraterrestrial beings, and in simulated encounters between two such races. 

Many spin-off organizations have formed, on line, and as far away as Japan. One such organization is the Contact consortium, which is focused on the medium of contact in multi-user virtual worlds on the Internet.  

Contact has been closely allied with the SETI Institute, and its early participants created the hypothetical planet Epona as covered in the Discovery Channel documentary Natural History of an Alien.

The 27th  Contact conference was held on March 31 - April 2, 2012 at the SETI Institute and the Domain Hotel, in Sunnyvale, California. Beginning with the 28th conference, held in Mountain View, the organization adopted a biennial schedule. The 29th conference was held on April 1st-3rd, 2016, at the Domain Hotel, California.

External links
 Contact Conference homepage
 Contact Conference semi-official archive
 SETI League Announces 2005 Best Ideas Awards
 The Epona Project

Conferences in the United States
Astrobiology